In mathematics, especially homotopy theory, the mapping cone is a construction  of topology, analogous to a quotient space. It is also called the homotopy cofiber, and also notated . Its dual, a fibration, is called the mapping fibre. The mapping cone can be understood to be a mapping cylinder , with one end of the cylinder collapsed to a point. Thus, mapping cones are frequently applied in the homotopy theory of pointed spaces.

Definition
Given a map , the mapping cone  is defined to be the quotient space of the mapping cylinder  with respect to the equivalence relation , . Here  denotes the unit interval [0, 1] with its standard topology. Note that some authors (like J. Peter May) use the opposite convention, switching 0 and 1.

Visually, one takes the cone on X (the cylinder  with one end (the 0 end) identified to a point), and glues the other end onto Y via the map f (the identification of the 1 end).

Coarsely, one is taking the quotient space by the image of X, so ; this is not precisely correct because of point-set issues, but is the philosophy, and is made precise by such results as the homology of a pair and the notion of an n-connected map.

Example of circle 

Then the mapping cone  is homeomorphic to two disks joined on their boundary, which is topologically the sphere .

Double mapping cylinder 

The mapping cone is a special case of the double mapping cylinder. This is basically a cylinder  joined on one end to a space  via a map

and joined on the other end to a space  via a map

Dual construction: the mapping fibre 

The dual to the mapping cone is the mapping fibre . Given the pointed map  one defines the mapping fiber as

.

It is dual to the mapping cone in the sense that the product above is essentially the fibered product or pullback  which is dual to the pushout  used to construct the mapping cone. The two variants are related by an adjoint functor. Observe that the currying preserves the reduced nature of the maps: in the one case, to the tip of the cone, and in the other case, paths to the basepoint.

Applications

CW-complexes
Attaching a cell.

Effect on fundamental group
Given a space X and a loop  representing an element of the fundamental group of X, we can form the mapping cone .

Given a group presentation by generators and relations, one gets a 2-complex with that fundamental group.

Homology of a pair 

The mapping cone lets one interpret the homology of a pair as the reduced homology of the quotient.

 ,

which follows by applying excision to the mapping cone.

Relation to homotopy (homology) equivalences

A map  between simply-connected CW complexes is a homotopy equivalence if and only if its mapping cone is contractible.

More generally, a map is called n-connected (as a map) if its mapping cone is n-connected (as a space), plus a little more.

Let  be a fixed homology theory.

Mapping cones are famously used to construct the long coexact Puppe sequences, from which long exact sequences of homotopy and relative homotopy groups can be obtained.

See also
 Cofibration
 Mapping cone (homological algebra)

References

Algebraic topology